Lieutenant General Deependra Singh Hooda, PVSM, UYSM, AVSM, VSM & Bar, ADC (born 12 November 1956) is the former General Officer Commanding-in-Chief of the Indian army's Northern Command. The General Officer was the Northern Army Commander during the 'surgical strike' in September 2016. He is most prominently known for his views on Kashmir with a strong emphasis on human rights. With a career spanning forty years, he has served on both the Northern and Eastern borders of India.

Military career
He did his schooling from St. Columba's School, Delhi. He is an alumnus of National Defence Academy, Pune. He was commissioned into the Indian Army on 15 December 1976. He spent time in his early career in the 4th Battalion of the 4th Gorkha Rifles, which he later commanded.

His career spanned over four decades. He was awarded the Param Vishisht Seva Medal, Uttam Yudh Seva Medal, Ati Vishist Seva Medal and the Vishisht Seva Medal (Bar). He has been an instructor at the Military College of Telecommunication Engineering, Mhow and Col GS of a Strike Corps. He has also had tenures in the Military Operations Directorate and the Quarter Master General's Branch at the Army Headquarters. He has also served on the United Nations Mission in Ethiopia and Eritrea for which he was awarded the UNMEE Medal.

He retired on 30 November 2016 after nearly 40 years of service in the Indian Army.

Awards and decorations

Dates of rank

Personal life
He is married to Rashmi Hooda.

References

Indian military personnel
Recipients of the Uttam Yudh Seva Medal
1956 births
Recipients of the Param Vishisht Seva Medal
Recipients of the Ati Vishisht Seva Medal
Living people
Recipients of the Vishisht Seva Medal